Per Olof Sköldberg (19 January 1910 – 16 July 1979) was a Swedish sport shooter. He won a silver medal in running deer at the 1952 Summer Olympics in Helsinki, and a silver medal at the 1956 Summer Olympics in Melbourne.

Sköldberg also won four world titles, in 1937 and 1947, in deer single and double shot events, team and individual.

References

1910 births
1979 deaths
Swedish male sport shooters
Shooters at the 1952 Summer Olympics
Shooters at the 1956 Summer Olympics
Olympic shooters of Sweden
Olympic silver medalists for Sweden
Olympic medalists in shooting
Medalists at the 1952 Summer Olympics
Medalists at the 1956 Summer Olympics
20th-century Swedish people